Swing is a French film by Tony Gatlif, released in 2002.

Synopsis 
In a suburb of Strasbourg, Alsace, France, ten-year-old boy, Max, spends his summer vacation with his grandmother. He hears Manouche gypsy Romani music being played in a local bar, and loves it. He goes to visit the gypsies in search of a guitar, where he meets a young Romani tomboy, 'Swing'. She introduces Max to her gypsy community who live in caravans and down-at-heel public housing. Over several days, Max is taken into the community to witness Romani lifestyle, traditions, knowledge of plants, and particularly their Manouche music. Max is particularly fascinated by Miraldo, the Romani guitarist he first heard in the bar, and asks to take guitar lessons with him (Miraldo is played by one of the greatest guitarists of gypsy jazz, Tchavolo Schmitt).

Max and Swing develop a close bond, set to many strong and catchy musical moments (some featuring the music of Django Reinhardt). Max hears from a chainsmoking grandmother (played by Helene Mershtein) how she and one other child were the sole survivors of a group or Romani interred and shot during the Second World War.  The mixed Algerian/Romany heritage of the Director is given homage by featuring a musical jam session with Miraldo and Khalid, played by Abdellatif Chaarani.

The film comes to a climax as Max finally learns to play a gypsy tune during his lesson, but just as we surmise Miraldo has succeeded in teaching him, he suffers a heart attack outside his caravan and dies.  Following Romany tradition, Miraldo's caravan and personal effects are burned. Max's holiday comes to an end, and Max and Swing part company with sadness.  The implication is that Max's Gadjo status (a Romani term designating those who are not of that ethnic group) is a gulf between them.

Details 
 Title: Swing
 Director: Tony Gatlif
 Screenplay: Tony Gatlif
 Cinematography: Claude Garnier
 Original Music: Mandino Reinhardt, Tchavolo Schmitt, Abdellatif Chaarani, Tony Gatlif
 Release date: 20 March 2002
 French and Romany with English subtitles
 Genre: Dramatic comedy
 Duration: 87 min.

Cast 
 Oscar Copp: Max
 Lou Rech: Swing
 Tchavolo Schmitt: Miraldo
Mandino Reinhardt: Mandino
 Abdellatif Chaarani: Khalid
 Fabienne Mai: Max's grandmother
 Ben Zimet: Doctor Liberman
 Colette Lepage: Miraldo's wife
 Marie Genin: Max's mother
 Helene Mershtein: the grandmother

Critical appreciation 
 There's always something magic about a Tony Gatlif film. So how does Gatlifs latest film "Swing" stack up against his previous films. The news is good. "Swing" is exciting. "Swing" is vibrant. "Swing" is pure magic. And yes, that fabulous toe-tapping, energetic music is back. In the words of Tony Gatlif himself, "Music is the liberty that inspires me when I make my films, and gives me the energy to go out and meet people throughout the world. The film could not be made without music." Once again Director & Writer Tony Gatlif brings us an experience which incorporates the gypsy world and their culture.
 "Swing is undeniably loose, a drawback in a thriller, probably, but an advantage for a film that tries to capture a fleeting moment as delicate as light on a pond".  Rick McGinnis, who gave it 4 stars

References

External links
 The Movie Pages present Swing
 Swing on the Internet Movie Database

2002 films
French comedy-drama films
Films directed by Tony Gatlif
2000s French films